The Breeders Crown Open Pace is a harness racing event for Standardbred pacers. It is one part of the Breeders Crown annual series of twelve races for both Standardbred pacers and trotters. The Open Pace for horses age four and older was first run in 1985. It is contested over a distance of one mile. Race organizers have awarded the event to various racetracks across North America. The 2017 race will be held at Hoosier Park in Anderson, Indiana, United States.

Historical race events
In 2010, Pocono Downs became the first venue to host all 12 events on a single night.

At the Meadowlands Racetrack in 2009, Won The West set the Open Pace record time of 1:47 flat which was then, and remains so through 2016, the fastest pacing mile in the entire Breeders Crown series.

North American Locations

Track & Abbreviation -- State/Province -- times hosted
Meadowlands Racetrack (Mxx) New Jersey (13)
Woodbine Racetrack (Wdb) Ontario (4)
Mohawk Raceway (Moh) Ontario (4)
Hoosier Park (Hp) Indiana (2)
Pocono Downs (Pcd) Pennsylvania (2)
Freehold Raceway (Fhl) New Jersey (2)
The Meadows Racetrack (Mea) Pennsylvania (1)
Pompano Park (Ppk) Florida (1)
Scioto Downs (Scd) Ohio (1)
Roosevelt Raceway (Rr) New York (1)
Los Alamitos Race Course (Lrc) California  (1)
Freestate Raceway (Fsr) Maryland (1)
Northfield Park (Nfl) Ohio (1)

Records
 Most wins by a driver
 5 – Michel Lachance (1985, 1989, 1991, 1997, 2000) & John Campbell (1992, 2002, 2003, 2011, 2014)

 Most wins by a trainer
 8 – Robert McIntosh (1991, 1992, 1993, 2014)

 Stakes record
 1:47 0/0 – Won The West (2009)

Winners of the Breeders Crown Open Pace

References

Recurring sporting events established in 1985
Harness racing in the United States
Harness racing in Canada
Breeders Crown
Racing series for horses
Horse races in New York (state)
Horse races in New Jersey
Horse races in Pennsylvania
Horse races in Ohio
Horse races in Florida
Horse races in California
Horse races in Maryland
Horse races in Indiana
Horse races in Ontario
1985 establishments in North America